David Kent Bassore (September 29, 1954 – April 3, 2006) was an American football coach. He served as the head football coach at Winona State University in Winona, Minnesota from 1987 to 1989 and at his alma mater, William Jewell College in Liberty, Missouri, from 2001 to 2004, compiling a career college football coaching record of 25–48. Bassore was killed in an automobile accident on April 3, 2006, in Kansas City, Missouri.

Head coaching record

College

References

External links
 

1954 births
2006 deaths
Sam Houston Bearkats football coaches
William Jewell Cardinals football coaches
William Jewell Cardinals football players
Winona State Warriors football coaches
High school football coaches in Kansas
People from Aurora, Missouri
Players of American football from Missouri
Road incident deaths in Kansas